Sandymoor is a civil parish in Runcorn, Halton, Cheshire, England, with a population of approximately 3,663. The majority of housing in Sandymoor was built post-1990 and the parish was formed in 2008 by the Halton (Parish Electoral Arrangements) Order 2008. Sandymoor lies approximately 3 miles east of Runcorn town centre, 4 miles south-west from Warrington town centre and 2 miles north of the M56 motorway.

Sandymoor is an affluent parish, having been ranked among the 10% least deprived LSOAs (Neighbourhoods) in the country in the Department for Communities and Local Government's 'English indices of Deprivation'. Sandymoor has a relatively young population with an average age of 33.6 years, compared to an average age of 40 years for the general UK population.

History
The area of Sandymoor was designated as part of Runcorn New Town in 1964 and was initially allocated to industry. The new town masterplan was amended in 1975 and the land redesignated as residential. In 2008, Sandymoor Parish Council was created.

Places of interest

Within Sandymoor
 Sandymoor Local Centre, a retail development including a convenience store, a bakery and a vets.
 Sandymoor Hall, a community hall hosting daily clubs, classes and events.
 Sandymoor Ormiston Academy, a secondary school established in 2012.
 Manor Park, an industrial estate containing manufacturing, office and warehouse facilities for companies including Thermo Fisher Scientific, The Protein Works, Warburtons, Lidl, B&M and Cheshire Constabulary Custody Suite.

Near to Sandymoor
 Norton Priory, a museum and the most excavated monastery site in Britain
 Sci-Tech Daresbury, a science and innovation campus whose tenants include the Daresbury Laboratory and Cockcroft Institute
 Runcorn Shopping City, the main shopping area in Runcorn opened by Queen Elizabeth II in 1972
 The Mersey Gateway bridge, a 1,000 m long cable-stayed bridge across the River Mersey between Runcorn and Widnes. On the Runcorn side this bridge connects to the Daresbury Expressway (A558) and the Central Expressway (A533) towards Sandymoor.
 Daresbury Village, famous as the birthplace of Lewis Carroll
 Creamfields, a large dance music festival which is held on August Bank Holiday
 The Brindley theatre and arts centre, an award-winning theatre and arts centre in Runcorn Old Town
 Runcorn East railway station
 Walton Hall
 Halton Castle
 Norton Water Tower
 Bridgewater Canal
 Manchester Ship Canal

Education
Sandymoor is served by a number of nearby schools, namely:
 Sandymoor Ormiston Academy, a secondary school originally formed as a free school in 2012, now an Ormiston academy since December 2019
 Windmill Hill Primary School, rated as 'outstanding' by Ofsted in 2013 
 Daresbury Primary School, rated as 'outstanding' by Ofsted in 2008 
 Moore Primary School, rated as 'good' by Ofsted in 2013

References

External links
 Sandymoor Parish Council.

Civil parishes in Cheshire
Runcorn